Robert Grandison Leavitt (September 20, 1883 – February 2, 1954) was an American track and field athlete, winner of 110 m hurdles at the 1906 Intercalated Games.

Robert Leavitt was a native of Boston, Massachusetts, and attended Mercersburg Academy in Mercersburg, Pennsylvania and Phillips Exeter Academy in Exeter, New Hampshire, and graduated from Williams College in 1907. He never won any major tournament except the Olympic Games.

At Athens, American Hugo Friend was favored to win the gold medal in high hurdles. But Friend stumbled against the first hurdle and was out. Leavitt and Alfred Healey from Great Britain leaped over the hurdles in one rhythm and finished in the same time. After protracted discussion, Olympic officials decided that Leavitt had won by one foot.

References

External links
 
 

1883 births
1954 deaths
American male hurdlers
Athletes (track and field) at the 1906 Intercalated Games
Olympic gold medalists for the United States in track and field
Mercersburg Academy alumni
Phillips Exeter Academy alumni
Williams College alumni
Medalists at the 1906 Intercalated Games